The North Coulombe river (in French: rivière Coulombe Nord) is a tributary of the Coulombe River which flows into lake Aylmer crossed by the Saint-François River which constitutes a tributary of the south shore of the St. Lawrence River.

The course of the Coulombe North River flows on the South Shore of the St. Lawrence River, in Quebec, Canada. It crosses the territory of the municipalities of:
 Saints-Martyrs-Canadiens, located in the MRC Arthabaska Regional County Municipality, in the administrative region of Centre-du-Québec;
 Beaulac-Garthby, located in the regional county municipality (MRC) Les Appalaches Regional County Municipality, in the administrative region of Estrie.

Geography 

The main neighboring watersheds of the North Coulombe River are:
 north side: lake Breeches, Sunday lake;
 east side: Moose River, Longue Pointe watercourse, lake Aylmer, Saint-François River;
 south side: lake Aylmer, bay Ward, Saint-François River;
 west side: rivière au Canard.

From the head lake, the Coulombe North river flows on  according to the following segments:
  north-east, then east, to a stream (coming from the north-east);
  towards the south-east, parallel (south side) to the limit of the municipality of Disraeli, to the municipal limit of Beaulac-Garthby;
  towards the south-east, until its mouth.

The North Coulombe River flows into a forest area on the north shore of the Coulombe River, in the municipality of Beaulac-Garthby.

Toponymy 

The toponym "rivière Coulombe Nord" was officially registered on December 5, 1968, at the Commission de toponymie du Québec.

See also 

 List of rivers of Quebec

References 

Les Appalaches Regional County Municipality
Rivers of Chaudière-Appalaches
Rivers of Centre-du-Québec
Arthabaska Regional County Municipality